Katalyst Network was a company founded by Ashton Kutcher and Jason Goldberg, based in Los Angeles, California. It was the company behind television series such as Beauty and the Geek and Punk'd.

Founding history
The company was launched in 2000 by Ashton Kutcher and Jason Goldberg to develop television and film properties. In 2005, a social media division was added. The mission is to match storytelling with competitive distribution and technology platforms for some of the biggest brands in the world.

The company also founded a YouTube channel, Thrash Lab, to show unscripted content. The channel was partially funded by YouTube in 2012.

The company is now permanently closed.

References

External links
 Official page

Television production companies of the United States
Film production companies of the United States